René Marstrand la Cour (12 May 1927 – 29 December 2008) was a Danish sailor. He competed in the 6 Metre event at the 1948 Summer Olympics.

References

External links
 

1927 births
2008 deaths
Danish male sailors (sport)
Olympic sailors of Denmark
Sailors at the 1948 Summer Olympics – 6 Metre
Sportspeople from Aarhus